Raúl Brancaccio and Flavio Cobolli were the defending champions but only Brancaccio chose to defend his title, partnering Javier Barranco Cosano. Brancaccio lost in the quarterfinals to Íñigo Cervantes and Oriol Roca Batalla.

Cervantes and Roca Batalla won the title after defeating Pedro Cachín and Martín Cuevas 6–7(4–7), 7–6(7–4), [10–7] in the final.

Seeds

Draw

References

External links
 Main draw

Murcia Open - Doubles